Sophronica mirei is a species of beetle in the family Cerambycidae. It was described by Stephan von Breuning and Villiers in 1960.

References

Sophronica
Beetles described in 1960